Sundaram Natarajan is an Indian ophthalmologist. In 2002, he started a free clinic in Dharavi, a slum in Mumbai, and treated more than 8,000 people. He has also held free camps in various other suburbs of Mumbai such as Mankhurd and Govandi to treat the economically poor. In 2016, he also held a camp in Kashmir to operate and cure the victims of pellet gun firings.

In 2013, he was awarded with Padma Shri, India's fourth highest civilian honour. , he is head of the Aditya Jyot Eye Hospital in Wadala, Mumbai.

Education
Natarajan graduated from the Madras Medical College, Chennai, in 1980. He completed his Diploma in Ophthalmology (D.O) at the University of Madras in 1984 and Fellowship in Retina and Vitreous Surgery (F.R.V.S) at Sankara Nethralaya in 1985. 

He completed Fellow of All India Collegium of Ophthalmology (FAICO) in 2012, Fellowship of the Royal Colleges of Surgeons (FRCS) in Glasgow in 2018, and Fellow of European Latino American Society of Ophthalmology (FELAS) in 2019.

Awards and records
He was awarded Padma Shri, one of India's highest civilian awards, by President of India Shri Pranab Mukherjee in 2013.

He holds a former Guinness World Record for the most diabetic eye screenings in 8 hours. This record was achieved when 649 diabetes patients were screened in Dharavi, Mumbai.

He is a "Character Inductee" of the Retina Hall of Fame, being one of two Indians listed in 2017.

He was awarded a State Award for Meritorious Service by the Government of Jammu and Kashmir for creating a record by performing forty-seven vitreoretinal surgeries in two and a half days while in Jammu and Kashmir.

He holds a National Record in the Limca Book of Records for performing the first completely sutureless sclera bucking as well as a sutureless 23G vitrectomy.

Organizational awards

Current academic positions
President - Organized Medicine Academic Guild (OMAG)
Managing Trustee - Aditya Jyot Foundation for Twinkling Little Eyes
Managing Trustee - Aditya Jyot Research Foundation
Secretary - Aditya Jyot Eye Research Institute
Chairman - All India Ophthalmological Society (AIOS) Nationwide DR Screening Task Force
Chairman of the International Committee - All India Ophthalmological Society
Secretary General - Global Eye Genetics Consortium (GEGC)
Immediate Past President - International Ocular Trauma Society
Immediate Past President - Ocular Trauma Society of India (OTSI)
Representative of AIOS	ICO General Assembly
ICO Board of Trustees International Council of Ophthalmology
President - Asia Pacific Ophthalmic Trauma Society (APOTS)
Member - Euretina International Advisory Board
Hon. President	- Sankara Nethralaya Alumni Association
Regional Managing Editor - Eye World Asia Pacific, Indian Edition
Honorary Director - Indian Eye Injury Registry
Member	 - Council of Asia Pacific Intraocular Implant Association, Singapore
Executive committee member - International Society of Ocular Trauma
Hon. Secretary, Alumni Association-  Sankara Nethralaya
Vice President	- Indo-Japanese Ophthalmic Foundation
Patron - National Society for Prevention of Blindness, Mumbai Branch

References

External Links
 Aditya Jyot Eye Hospital

Recipients of the Padma Shri
Indian ophthalmologists
Living people
1957 births
People from Chennai